Norma Harris (born 22 April 1947) is a former American female sprinter.

Norma Harris claimed a gold medal in the women's 4 × 100 m relay event during the 1963 Pan American Games.

References 

1947 births
Living people
American female sprinters
American female track and field athletes
Pan American Games gold medalists for the United States
Pan American Games medalists in athletics (track and field)
Athletes (track and field) at the 1963 Pan American Games
Medalists at the 1963 Pan American Games
21st-century American women